McCarrs Creek is a suburb that is located adjacent to McCarrs Creek, approximately  west of Newport, at the headwaters of the Pittwater in northern Sydney, in the state of New South Wales, Australia. McCarrs Creek was gazetted as a suburb on 20 January 2012.

References 

Suburbs of Sydney
Northern Beaches Council